Dyschirius sellatus is a species of ground beetle in the subfamily Scaritinae. It was described by John Lawrence LeConte in 1857.

References

sellatus
Beetles described in 1857